The Tongillo Road Course was a temporary road course that was repaired between March 1987 and August 1988. The course was located in the Tongil-ro section of Seoul between the Philippine Expeditionary Forces To Korea memorial and Munsan, located north of Seoul on the unification road, which is off exit 16 of the Seoul Ring Expressway.

During the 1988 Summer Olympics, the venue hosted the all three road cycling events.

Most of the 1.665 million won spent on repairs was for road paving.

References
1988 Summer Olympics official report. Volume 1. Part 1. p. 206.

Venues of the 1988 Summer Olympics
Defunct sports venues in South Korea
Roads in South Korea
Sport in Seoul
Olympic cycling venues
Venues of the 1986 Asian Games
Asian Games cycling venues